Yun So-ha also written as Youn So-ha (Korean: 윤소하; Hanja: 尹昭夏; born 10 September 1961) is a South Korean politician that is a member of the National Assembly and served as the Floor Leader of the Justice Party.

Early life and education 
Yun was born in Okcheon-myeon, Haenam-gun, South Jeolla Province, South Korea in 1961. He graduated from the University of Mokpo; majoring in business administration. As a university student, he attempted to help citizens of Gwangju during the Gwangju Uprising.

Activism 
Yun joined the Mokpo Youth Union in 1985; a social movement that advocated for an end to the regime of Chun Doo-hwan.

In 1986, Yun was sent to prison after he protested against the School Stabilization Law which was a proposed law by Chun Doo-hwan to punish students that protested against his regime. After being released from prison in 1987, Yun took part in the June Struggle.

Political career 
In 2008, Yun ran for representative of Mokpo under the Democratic Labor Party, he came in third place.

In 2012, he once again ran for representative of Mokpo, he came in second place.

Due to proportional representation, Yun became a member of the National Assembly in 2016. He plans to run for representative of Mokpo in the upcoming 2020 South Korean legislative election.

Due to death of Roh Hoe-chan in 2018, Yun assumed the position of acting Floor Leader of the Justice Party. He was officially elected by party members on August 21, 2018.

References 

1961 births
South Korean politicians
Living people